The Augustus Bridge is a bridge in the city of Dresden, in the state Saxony in Germany.

Crossing the river Elbe, the road bridge connects the Innere Neustadt in the north (right bank) with the historic city centre to the south (left bank).

There has been a bridge at the same location since at least the 12th century. Under king Augustus II the Strong of Poland and Saxony, a new sandstone bridge was built with 12 arches between 1727 and 1731. This bridge was replaced by the present, also sandstone, bridge with 9 arches in order to provide a wider opening for river traffic. It was designed by Wilhelm Kreis and Theodor Klette.

Three tram lines of the Dresdner Verkehrsbetriebe pass over the Augustus Bridge. All are currently (2019) diverted due to reconstruction works.

The current bridge was built between 1907 and 1910.

References

Buildings and structures in Dresden
Tourist attractions in Dresden